Oloiphis is a genus of mites in the family Laelapidae.

Species
 Oloiphis magnificus Berlese, 1916

References

Laelapidae